Karlsbad (South Franconian: Kallsbad) is a municipality in the district of Karlsruhe, in Baden-Württemberg, Germany.

Geography and history 
The municipality is situated on the Alb-Pfinz Plateau in the northern Black Forest, 8 km east-southeast of Ettlingen, 13 km southeast of Karlsruhe, and 15 km west of Pforzheim.

Constituent villages 
The municipality of Karlsbad consists of 5 previously independent single-village municipalities united by the municipality reform in 1971:

Langensteinbach

Auerbach

Mutschelbach

Spielberg

Ittersbach

Neighbours

Karlsruhe 

In the north Karlsbad borders to Karlsruhe and its neighbourhoods Stupferich and Palmbach. Both of these neighbourhoods form part of a group of neighbourhood known as Karlsruhe's Bergdörfer (mountain villages). Most of Karlsruhe is situated within the Upper Rhine Plain, not so the Bergdörfer: They are situated on the mountains of the northern Black Forest and the western Kraichgau. They share the autobahn exit Karlsbad, situated within their borders, with their neighbour municipality and are connected with it through the Landesstraßen L609 and L623.

 Stupferich

The village Stupferich is a southeastern neighbourhood of Karlsruhe. Until it was integrated into the city of Karlsruhe in 1972 it was an independent municipality. In 2000 the village celebrated its 900th anniversary. In December 2011 it had about 2,650 inhabitants.

 Palmbach

The village Palmbach is an eastern neighbourhood of Karlsruhe. Until it was integrated into the city of Karlsruhe in 1975 it formed part of the municipality Wetterbsbach composed of the villages Palmbach and Grünwettersbach. Palmbach was founded in 1701 by 28 Waldensian refugee families consisting of 111 people from La Balme in the French Alps on an area of 306 acres belonging to Grünwettersbach. They called their settlement La Balme, just like the place, they came from, which turned into the village's current name still during the 18th century. In March 2012 Palmbach had about 1,800 inhabitants.

Waldbronn 

The western frontier of Karlsbad leads to Waldbronn, a municipality in the district of Karlsruhe at the borders of the Alb-Pfinz Plateau and within the Alb Valley with some 12,500 inhabitants. Just like Karlsbad, this municipality is also product of the municipality reform in Baden-Württemberg. Its current constituent villages and former independent municipalities joined the former single-village municipality Reichenbach:

 Etzenrot and Neurod (joined in 1971)
 Busenbach (joined in 1972)

In 1974 the enlarged municipality Reichenbach was renamed and received the name Waldbronn

Marxzell 

The southwestern frontier of Karlsbad borders to Marxzell, a municipality in the district of Karlsruhe with about 5,300 inhabitants (as of December 2011) consisting of the former independent municipalities

 Burbach: 
Burbach, Marxzell (also part of the other two former municipalities], Metzlinschwander Hof and the houses Fischweier and Weimersmühle.
 Pfaffenrot: 
Pfaffenrot and Gertrudenhof
 Schielberg: 
Schielberg, "Bergschmiede, Hotel", Schlotterhof, Steinhäusle and Frauenalb

Remchingen 

The municipality Remchingen in the Enz district borders to Karlsbad on the northeastern frontier of the last-mentioned. It is located within the Pfinz Valley, counts about 12,000 inhabitants and consists of the following former municipalities:

 Nöttingen (bordering to Auerbach),
 Wilferdingen
 Singen

Historic ties between Karlsbad and Remchingen become obvious comparing the coats of arms of the former municipalities. The flowers on Mutschelbach's coat of arms are quite similar to those of all three parts of Remchingen.

In addition, in both Nöttingen and Auerbach remains of Roman settlements have been found that can be dated back to circa 80 A.D.

Keltern 

To the east of Karlsbad borders Keltern, a municipality within the Enz district with approximately 9,000 inhabitants. It consists of the following villages:

 Dietenhausen
 Ellmendingen
 Weiler
 Dietenhausen
 Niebelsbach

Straubenhardt 

This municipality is located southeast of Karlsbad. Straubenhardt forms part of the Enz district with a total of approximately 11,000 inhabitants and is made up of the following previously independent municipalities:

 Conweiler
 Feldrennach
 Pfinzweiler
 Langenalb
 Ottenhausen
 Schwann

Politics

Coat of arms

Municipal partnership 
Karlsbad is a municipal partner of the following towns and municipalities:
 Heldrungen, Kyffhäuserkreis en Thuringia, 
 Hüttau, Salzburg (state)

Infrastructure 
Karlsbad can be accessed via the road or by train. Baden Airpark, the closest international airport, is situated at a straight-line distance of about 34 kilometers.

Railway 

Langensteinbach, Spielberg and Ittersbach are all connected to each other and to the cities of Karlsruhe and Ettlingen among others by the Busenbach–Ittersbach branch of the Alb Valley Railway (Albtalbahn), an electric railway that forms part of the Karlsruhe Stadtbahn. Ittersbach is the terminus of the branch, which operates as line S 11.
Buses connect Auerbach an Mutschelbach to the mentioned railway through the train stops in Langensteinbach.

Additional public transport 
In addition to the mentioned railway, six bus lines circulate in, to and from Karlsbad:
 KVV Line 153: Langensteinbach - Auerbach - Langensteinbach
 KVV Line 152: Langensteinbach - Mutschelbach - Langensteinbach
 KVV Line 118: Langensteinbach - Mutschelbach - Stupferich - Palmbach - Grünwettersbach (school days only)
 VPE Line 717 (708): Ittersbach - Pforzheim
 VPE Line 720: Ittersbach - Pforzheim
 VPE Line 721: Langensteinbach - Auerbach - Ellmendingen - Pforzheim

Road network 

Other main roads crossing Karlsbad are the following Landesstraßen:
 L562
 L563
 L564 (Albtalstraße, Alb Valley Road)
 L609
 L622
 L623

In former times especially Langensteinbach had serious traffic problems caused by several complicated road junctions controlled by traffic lights. The problem led to an interesting solution. Today Langensteinbach counts with two double roundabouts relieving the traffic conditions.

Culture and sights

Celebrities closely linked to Karlsbad
 Fritz Rau, * 1930-2013 German concert and tour promoter and son of a smith from Ittersbach
 Horst Floth, 1934–2005, bobsleigh pilot
 Hans Brydniak, * 1937, German national basketball player
 Werner Hahn, * 1944, Painter
 Jens Nowotny, * 1974, until 1985 SV Spielberg, former DFB national football player
 David Depenau, * 1970, German author, writer and hotelier

Historic buildings and structures
 Former town hall in Karlsbad-Spielberg
 Classical Protestant church in Karlsbad-Langensteinbach designed by Karl August Schwarz in Friedrich Weinbrenner-like style
 Ruins of the Saint Barbara chapel in Karlsbad-Langensteinbach, a chapel which can be dated back to 1330 AD.
 Ruins of the tower castle Burg Langensteinbach also called Römerturm (Roman tower), the remains of the former hill castle on site between 1100 and 1200 AD.

Economy

Companies based in Karlsbad
 Nero AG, formerly known as Ahead Software GmbH is known around the globe for its DVD and CD-burning software featuring the same name. It is located in Karlsbad-Ittersbach
 Harman Becker Automotive Systems is an important manufacturer of automotive audio, video and navigation systems located in Karlsbad-Ittersbach at the plant of the former Becker GmbH and in Farmington Hills, Michigan.
 Across Systems develops and produces Across Language Server, a leading CAT (computer-aided translation) tool besides and competing with SDL Trados, MemoQ or XTM Cloud. Across Systems was founded in 2005 as a spin-off of the Nero AG already mentioned above. The company is located in Glendale, California and Karlsbad-Ittersbach with its headquarters at the latter one.
 VANTAGE Digital GmbH was founded in 2004 is a producer of electronic audio and video entertainment products especially for HDTV and the European market. The company is located in Karlsbad-Ittersbach

Karlsbad worldwide 
Around the globe there are several places named Karlsbad or Carlsbad:
 Karlovy Vary (previously known as Karlsbad) in the 
 Carlsbad, California,  of America
 Carlsbad, New Mexico,  of America
 Carlsbad, Texas,  of America
 Carlsbad Springs, Ontario,

References

Karlsruhe (district)